The 1941 Connecticut Huskies football team represented the University of Connecticut in the 1941 college football season.  The Huskies were led by eighth-year head coach J. Orlean Christian and completed the season with a record of 2–6.

Schedule

References

Connecticut
UConn Huskies football seasons
Connecticut Huskies football